Martinrea International Inc. is a Canadian auto parts manufacturer based in Vaughan, Ontario. Its principal focus is on North America but it also operates in Europe and Asia.

Principal activities
Design and development of lightweight structures and propulsion systems for the automotive industry using the company's expertise in metal forming and aluminium casting and also in fluids management.

Manufacture of:
 Engine blocks, transmissions, cases, housings and ladder frames
 Front and rear suspensions
 Body and chassis components
 Lines and tubes for air conditioning and heating, fuel, power steering and brakes

History
Royal Laser Tech Corporation was formed under the Business Corporations Act in 1998. A business with only a few employees, it provided and laser trimmed metal store fixtures and fabrications. Rob Wildeboer, Fred Jaekel, President of Cosma, and Nick Orlando, Vice President of Cosma finance joined Royal Laser Tech in August 2001 and focused new business on supply to original equipment manufacturers in the automotive industry.

Expansion by acquisition
 Rea International. In April of 2002, Royal Laser Tech Corporation purchased Rea International, a fluid system business, and automatically became a tier one supplier for General Motors. 
In June of 2002, Royal Laser Tech Corporation changed its name to Martinrea International Inc.
 Pilot Industries, fuel systems purchased 2002
 Corydon, Indiana, plant bought for Icon Metal Forming in February 2005.
 Depco International injection moulding and roll-formed metal products purchased 2006
 Thyssen-Krupp Budd. In November 2006, Martinrea International received the approval of US antitrust authorities to buy the North America body and chassis operations of Thyssen-Krupp Budd.
 SKD Automotive Group. 2009
 Honsel. Manufacturer of aluminum engine blocks, transmission cases, suspension and other automotive parts, located in Meschede,  Germany. 2011
 Metalsa. In March 2020, Martinrea International Inc. announced the acquisition of the Structural Components for Passenger Cars operations of Metalsa S.A. de C.V.

References

External links

Companies listed on the Toronto Stock Exchange
Companies based in Vaughan
Manufacturing companies of Canada
Manufacturing companies based in Ontario
Auto parts suppliers of Canada